The Eastern Gulf Fleet Command or officially Eastern Fleet (EF), is one of the regional fleets of the Saudi Arabian Navy. It is headquartered at Royal Naval Base at Jubail, on the east coast of the Arabian Kingdom, responsible for military operations of the Saudi Navy in the Gulf waters.

Rear Admiral Fahd Al-Shamrani is reported as the Fleet Commander ("Fleet operations manager").
The Royal Saudi Navy was founded in 1957.

See also
Western Fleet (Saudi Arabia)

References

External links
 

Fleet
Naval fleets
Military units and formations established in 1957
Military units and formations of Saudi Arabia